Tetraloniella taprobanicola, also known as Tetraloniella (Tetraloniella) taprobanicola, is a species of bee belonging to the family Apidae subfamily Apinae. It is found endemic to Sri Lanka.

References

External links
 http://animaldiversity.org/accounts/Tetralonia_taprobanicola/classification/
 https://www.academia.edu/7390502/AN_UPDATED_CHECKLIST_OF_BEES_OF_SRI_LANKA_WITH_NEW_RECORDS
 https://www.itis.gov/servlet/SingleRpt/SingleRpt?search_topic=TSN&search_value=766453

Apinae
Insects of Sri Lanka
Insects described in 1913